The Canton of Agde is a subdivision of the French department of Hérault, and its subdivision, the Arrondissement of Béziers.

Municipalities
Since the French canton reorganisation which came into effect in March 2015, the communes of the canton of Agde are:
 Agde
 Bessan
 Marseillan
 Portiragnes
 Vias

History
This Canton was revised in 2008. In 2015 the commune of Portiragnes became part of it.

Councillors

Pictures of the canton

References

External links 
 Site of INSEE

Agde